Michael is the first posthumous album by American singer-songwriter Michael Jackson. It was released on December 10, 2010, by Epic Records and Sony Music Entertainment. Michael is the first release of all-new Michael Jackson material since Invincible in 2001 and the seventh overall release since Jackson's death in 2009. The album was produced by Theron "Neff-U" Feemster, John McClain, Giorgio Tuinfort, and Teddy Riley, among others, and features guest performances by Akon and Lenny Kravitz.

Michael debuted at number three on the US Billboard 200 albums chart and was certified Platinum by the Recording Industry Association of America (RIAA) in the United States. It produced four singles: "Hold My Hand", "Hollywood Tonight", "Behind the Mask", and "(I Like) The Way You Love Me", accompanied by music videos. "Hold My Hand" was a Billboard Hot 100 top 40 hit and has been certified Gold in the US.

Background
Announced on November 12, 2010, Michael features 10 tracks on the 2010 edition with the disputed tracks. "Breaking News" was the first song from the album to be released and was available for radio airplay. According to Sony, the song, along with two other tracks from the album, "Monster" and "Keep Your Head Up," was recorded in the home studio of Jackson family friend Eddie Cascio in New Jersey in 2007 and was "recently brought to completion."

In the years prior to his death, Jackson was reported to be working with contemporary hitmakers such as singer-songwriter Akon and producer RedOne. The first official single from Michael, "Hold My Hand", is a duet with Akon recorded in Las Vegas in 2007. Co-writer Claude Kelly told HitQuarters that it was the song's theme of friendship and togetherness that had struck a chord with Jackson. A handwritten note from Michael belonging to his Estate indicated his desire that "Hold My Hand" be the first single on his next project. However, in its unfinished state, the song leaked in July 2008. Before the release, Akon stated that the final version would have more of Jackson's vocals. The song was released globally on Monday, November 15 at 12:01am EST.

Prior to the album's release, a lawyer for Jackson's father Joe stated that Jackson was a perfectionist and "would never have wanted his unfinished material to be released". Jackson collaborator will.i.am said it was "disrespectful" to release the material as Jackson was not able to approve it.

Composition
Michael is composed of R&B, pop, soul and rock songs. Five out of the album's seven tracks were written by Michael Jackson on the edition without the disputed tracks. The album's full length is 27 minutes 24 seconds and it contains 7 songs on the edition without the disputed tracks. Michael opens with "Hold My Hand", the first line in the first verse recites the lyrics "This life don't last forever", and ends with "Much Too Soon", the last line in the last verse recites the lyrics "I guess I learned my lesson much too soon". The majority of the songs on the album are songs that were written and recorded during the Invincible era and onwards to the This Is It era. The album contains two songs that were written during the Thriller era, "Behind the Mask" and "Much Too Soon". The latter features Australian musician Tommy Emmanuel on the guitar. The song "(I Like) The Way You Love Me" previously appeared on The Ultimate Collection (2004) with the title "The Way You Love Me" as an unreleased track. For Michael, the song has been re-arranged and more vocals have been added. The song "Best of Joy" is one of the last that Jackson recorded during his lifetime, having written and recorded it in 2008, one year before his death.

Artwork
The album cover artwork, a 2009 commissioned oil painting by African American artist Kadir Nelson, features two putti (one black, one white) placing a crown on Jackson's head against a mural depicting the images of the singer at different stages in his career. Nelson said that Jackson approached him several years ago to create a project detailing his life and career. The project stalled but was revived in 2009 by one of the estate's executors, John McClain, who has worked with Michael's sister Janet during her time at A&M.  "Michael wears a golden suit of armor and stares at the viewer as he is crowned by cupids," Nelson said. "He places his hand over his heart and looks directly at the viewer, a symbol of Jackson's big heart and strong connection to his fans and music. A monarch butterfly sits on his shoulder, another symbol of Jackson's metamorphosis as a singer and entertainer, as well as a symbol of royalty. His musical history unfolds behind him." The original Sony publicity release of the album cover featured the Prince symbol in a bubble next to the tiger's head. This sparked discussion on the internet as to whether Prince was involved on any of the new songs. The official response from Prince's camp was "No permission was granted" and the symbol has since been removed from the cover on all official Sony websites.

Promotion and singles
"Breaking News" was the first song from the album to be unveiled. On November 5, a video teaser for the song was released on Jackson's official website. It opens with a montage of various television journalists reporting breaking news about Jackson, followed by the musical introduction of a song. The montage refers to the tabloid stories and legal troubles that plagued Jackson in the years leading up to his death. On November 8, 2010, the full length version of the song was released, and made available on MichaelJackson.com for one week. The premiere of the song launched the public controversy about the authenticity of the vocals that plagued the album all the way through its promo campaign and ultimately resulted in lower than projected sales. The rumored single of another controversial Cascio song, "Monster", was subsequently cancelled.

The album's first single, "Hold My Hand", was released on November 15, 2010. The filming for the official video of "Hold My Hand" began on Saturday, November 20 in Tustin, California. There was a casting call posted up on Jackson's official website, saying that they were "looking for his fans of all ages who want to be a part of this iconic event." On November 30, 2010, the final version of "Much Too Soon" was unveiled and announced that it would play on iTunes Ping for one week. On December 3, 2010, talk show host and comedian Ellen DeGeneres premiered the song "Hollywood Tonight" on The Ellen DeGeneres Show. On December 6, 2010, talk show host Oprah Winfrey premiered controversial songs "Keep Your Head Up", and "Monster" during her talk show. On December 7, 2010, the final version of "(I Can't Make It) Another Day" was unveiled on iTunes Ping for one week.

On December 8, 2010, the entire Michael album was released on Jackson's official website for preview. Sony Music had a listening party for the album at Roseland Ballroom on December 13. On Friday, December 10, 2010, a  poster depicting the Michael album artwork was erected at the Rectory Farm in Middlesex, which broke a Guinness world record for the largest poster in the world, making it the 4th record Michael Jackson made in the Guinness Book of World Records, and the first record he broke posthumously. The poster, made of PVC and weighing one ton, took engineers three hours to install and was located less than 3,000 meters from one of Heathrow airport's main runways, literally viewable by all planes arriving and departing. The poster stayed at that location until December 23, 2010, after which, it traveled via sea-container into continental Europe where it was toured and displayed.

"Hollywood Tonight" was the second official single, which was released in Italy on February 11, 2011, and in Poland on February 14, 2011. "Behind the Mask", the third single in this album, was released in France on February 21, 2011. "(I Like) The Way You Love Me", the fourth and final single released in South Korea as a digital single on January 18, 2011, and formally released in Italian and Chinese radio stations in July 2011.

Controversy

Authenticity of vocals on three tracks 
The authenticity of the vocals on the tracks "Breaking News", "Keep Your Head Up", and "Monster" is disputed. The tracks, along with nine other unreleased songs leaked online, are known as the Cascio tracks. They are attributed to Jackson, Eddie Cascio and James Porte and were allegedly recorded in the Cascios' basement in 2007, according to the documentary detailing the making of the album. Doubts over whether the vocals were by Jackson have been raised by his mother Katherine Jackson, his children Prince and Paris, his sister La Toya, his nephews T.J., Taj, and Taryll, music producer will.i.am, and fans. Jackson's brother Randy Jackson claimed that family members were not allowed at his studio where the album was being completed. According to Randy, when producer Teddy Riley played him some of the tracks, "I immediately said it wasn't his voice".

Before the premiere of "Breaking News", Sony Music Group stated it had "complete confidence in the results of our extensive research, as well as the accounts of those who were in the studio with Michael, that the vocals on the new album are his own". Producer Riley, Frank DiLeo and Jackson's estate defended Sony's claims that the song is authentic. On December 6, 2010, the Cascio family appeared on Oprah, where Eddie Cascio insisted the songs were sung by Jackson, and showed the studio where he had allegedly recorded the songs. Riley, who had worked on "Monster" and "Breaking News", said that the confusion had come about as a product of processing Jackson's vocals using software such as Melodyne. In September 2013, almost three years after the album release, Riley wrote on Twitter that his participation in the project had been "set up". Recording of the Cascio tracks was rumored to be recorded around late/early 2007. Fans have suggested that Italian-American R&B singer Jason Malachi recorded vocals for the tracks, but this was denied by the Jackson estate's lawyer. On January 16, 2011, a statement appeared on Malachi's Facebook page "confessing" to recording the vocals; however, Malachi claimed on MySpace that his Facebook and website had been hacked. Malachi's manager Thad Nauden stated that "Jason wants everyone to know beyond a shadow of a doubt, he did not sing a single note on the album".

On June 12, 2014, a consumer who had purchased Michael filed a class-action lawsuit against Sony Music, the Jackson Estate, MJJ Productions, Cascio and Porte for violation of consumer laws, unfair competition and fraud. The complaint was based on an expert report prepared by forensic phonetician Dr. George Papcun that contested the authenticity of the vocals. According to the lawsuit, the report had been peer-reviewed and supported by a second well-credentialed independent audio expert. Sony, the Estate, Cascio and Porte raised First Amendment defense, claiming that regardless of the songs' authenticity, they had a constitutional right to attribute them to Jackson. On June 30, 2016, the judge refused to grant defendants' motion and ordered that the case proceeds to class certification. On August 23, 2018, some sources reported that Sony had admitted in court that the vocals on the Cascio songs were not performed by Jackson. The next day, Sony lawyer Zia Modabber dismissed the reports, stating that "no one has conceded that Michael Jackson did not sing on the songs".

On June 29, 2022, the Jackson website spokesperson reported that 3 of the 10 tracks from the album are no longer available on YouTube, Apple Music, and Spotify as a result of a continual distraction to all listeners. A CD reissue of the album was released on September 9, 2022 that also dropped the three tracks.

Dave Grohl's album credit
The album credits Dave Grohl with drums on the track "(I Can't Make It) Another Day". Grohl confirmed that he had recorded for the track, but said he was not contacted afterwards and that the final track does not feature his playing.

Critical reception

Michael received mixed reviews from most music critics. At Metacritic, which assigns a normalized rating out of 100 to reviews from mainstream critics, the album received an average score of 54, based on 19 reviews, which indicates "mixed or average reviews". Despite media skepticism and some dissent within Jackson family ranks, reviews largely found Michael better than expected. Joe Vogel of The Huffington Post stated that "the bottom line is this: Michael contains some very impressive new material" and "His habits, his obsessions, his versatility, and his genius are on display at every turn. Who else could move so seamlessly from social anthem to floor burner, fleet hip hop to cosmic rock, vintage funk to poignant folk ballad?"

Dan Martin of NME called the album "kind of enjoyable" but commented that "if this decent-enough album is the best of the bunch, things are going to get ugly from here on in". Neil McCormick of The Telegraph called the album "a fine album" and stated that "It is certainly a great deal better than anyone had any right to expect. Jackson is finally about to get the comeback he craved." Jody Rosen of Rolling Stone thought the album was "not a Michael Jackson album", and Jackson "would not have released anything like this compilation, a grab bag of outtakes and outlines," but "it's a testament to the man's charisma that Michael can be compelling." Leah Greenblatt of Entertainment Weekly called it "certainly no great affront to his name", while The New York Times said it was a "miscellany of familiar Jackson offerings: inspirational, loving, resentful and paranoid."

Kitty Empire in The Observer said Jackson sounded "paler, more emaciated, more effects-laden" than on his classic songs such as 'Billie Jean'. She characterized the album as a "hotchpotch of odds and sods that often make plain their co-authors" but singled out the "breezy" and "carefree" '(I Like) The Way That You Love Me' and the "pugnacious" 'Hollywood Tonight' for praise. The Reno Gazette-Journal gave the album 3 stars out of 4, while the Toronto Sun gave it 3 stars out of 5. Nima Baniamer of Contactmusic.com gave the album 4/5 and stated that Jackson still seems to hold the capability to effortlessly transgress music genres. Baniamer also commented, "It wouldn't be a decent Jackson record if it wasn't surrounded by controversy. 'Breaking News' is a great track that touches upon the media's obsession with the pop icon; ironically a track further surrounded by dispute as fans have claimed that it may not even be Jackson's own voice on the track."

Commercial performance
The album was released by Epic Records and Sony Music Entertainment. It debuted at number one in Germany, selling 85,000 copies in its first week. The album also debuted at number one in Austria, Italy, the Netherlands, and Sweden. In the United States, Michael debuted at number three on the Billboard 200 with first-week sales of 228,000 copies, followed by 150,000 the next week, but in subsequent weeks, its total sales had shrunk to 27,000 units, 18,000 units and then 11,000 units for the week ending on January 16, 2011. The album debuted at number five in France, with first-week sales of 26,689 copies. In Germany, “Michael” was the biggest debut of the year, selling 85,000 copies in its first week. In Denmark, the album debuted at number four selling 4,936 copies in its first week. On December 19, 2010, the album opened in the United Kingdom at number four with sales of 113,000, which was Michael Jackson's biggest opening sales week in the United Kingdom since the release of Dangerous nearly 20 years before. In its first five weeks the album sold over 434,000 copies in the United States, but failed to match This Is It, which sold 890,000 copies in five weeks. In the same week the album was certified platinum by the RIAA for shipping over a million copies.

Michael received numerous gold and platinum certifications worldwide.

Track listing

Notes
 signifies co-producer
"(I Like) The Way You Love Me" was released in its early version on The Ultimate Collection (2004) with the title "The Way You Love Me". The back of the album says "This album contains 6 previously unreleased vocal tracks" (on the 2010 edition, it says "This album contains 9 previously unreleased vocal tracks") to reflect that "(I Like) The Way You Love Me" was previously released in its early form.
"Behind the Mask" samples a recording of the song of the same name, as performed by the Yellow Magic Orchestra.
As of June 29, 2022, "Keep Your Head Up", "Monster" and "Breaking News" are no longer available to download or stream on digital versions of the album. Sony Music Entertainment stated that this was due to the on-going distraction that legal litigations over their authenticity was causing fans. On September 9, 2022, a CD reissue of the album was released which also removed these three tracks.

Personnel
Credits adapted from Michael album liner notes (2010 edition).

 Michael Jackson – lead vocals (tracks 1, 2, 4, 6, 8, 9, 10), arranger, background vocals (tracks 8, 9), conductor, programming
 Kory Aaron – music recording assistant (track 1)
 Alex Alvarez – bass (track 9), additional music programming (8), studio technician (8)
 Christopher Austopchuk – creative director
 Eelco Bakker – music recording assistant (track 1)
 Dave Baron – drum machine, noise, synthesizer programming (track 8)
 Charlie Bisharat – concert master (track 10)
 Edward Brown – keyboards (track 2)
 Brad Buxer – producer (track 6), composer (2)
 David Campbell – music arranger, conductor (track 10)
 William C. Champlin – piano (track 4)
 Paulinho da Costa – percussion (tracks 4, 9)
 Thomas Drayton – bass (track 4)
 Scott Elgin – recording engineer (tracks 5, 7, instrumental: 2), audio mixing (2)
 Tommy Emmanuel – guitar (track 10)
 Theron "Neff-U" Feemster – producer (tracks 2, 4, 6), drum machine (4), all other instruments (6), keyboards (2, 4)
 Şerban Ghenea – audio mixing (tracks 1, 4, 6)
 Quentinn Gilkey – assistant recording engineer (tracks 5, 7, instrumental: 2)
 Khaliq Glover – recording engineer (tracks 5, 7, 9), audio mixing (9)
 Mark "Exit" Goodchild – recording engineer (track 1)
 Dave Grohl – drums (track 8)
 John Hanes – audio mixing (tracks 4, 6)
 Henry Hirsch – Michael Jackson's vocal recording engineer (track 8)
 Jean-Marie Horvat – audio mixing (tracks 2, 5, 7)
 Eric Jackson – guitar (track 2)
 Taryll Jackson – spoken word voices (track 2)
 Craig Johnson – archivist
 Alphonso Jones – additional background vocals (track 9)
 Suzie Katayama – accordion, music contractor (track 10)
 Claude Kelly – composer (track 1)
 Lenny Kravitz – lead vocals, background vocals, producer, composer, bass, drum machine, electric guitar, gong, horn samples, mini moog, audio mixing, noise, string samples, timpani (track 8)
 Dennis Krijnen – orchestra recording assistant (track 1)
 Sheri Lee – art direction, creative director, design
 John McClain – producer (tracks 9, 10)
 Danny Ray McDonald, Jr. – human whistle (track 2)
 Vlado Meller – mastering
 Mischke – additional background vocals, vocal recording engineer (tracks 2, 6)
 Tommy Morgan – harmonica (track 10)
 Chris Mosdell – composer (track 9)
 James Murray – instrumental recording engineer (tracks 2, 4, 6)
 Kadir Nelson – cover art
 Jon Nettlesbey – digital editing (track 9), drum machine (9), recording engineer (2, 9), additional keyboards (9), audio mixing (9), sequencing (9)
 Wessel Oltheten – orchestra recording engineer (track 1)
 Matt Paul – music recording assistant (track 1)
 Greg Phillinganes – additional keyboards (track 9)
 Mike Phillips – saxophone (track 9)
 Justin Pintar – music recording assistant (track 1)
 Michael Durham Prince – archivist, instrumental recording engineer (track 2), human whistle (2), vocal recording engineer (2, 4, 6)
 The Regiment – horn section (track 2)
 Teddy Riley – producer (tracks 2, 5, 7), spoken bridge lyrics (2), audio mixing (2, 5, 7), music programming (2, 5, 7)
 Tim Roberts – audio mixing assistant (tracks 4, 6)
 Christina Rodriguez – art direction, design
 Craig Ross – 12 string electric guitar (track 8)
 Ryuichi Sakamoto – composer (track 9)
 Mark Santangelo – mastering assistant
 Miguel Scott – music recording assistant (track 1)
 Allen Sides – recording engineer (track 9), audio mixing (10)
 Leon F. Sylvers III – background vocal arrangement (track 9)
 Evvy Tavasci – archivist
 Aliaune "Akon" Thiam – lead vocals, producer, composer, all other instruments, music programming (track 1)
 Giorgio Tuinfort – producer, composer, all other instruments, music programming (track 1)
 Franck Van Der Heijden – string arrangements (track 1)
 Erick Donell Walls – guitar (tracks 2, 4, 6)
 Ryan Wiese – music recording assistant (track 1)
 Shanice Wilson – additional background vocals (track 9)
 Mack Woodward – music recording assistant (track 1)
 Big Jim Wright – drum machine, keyboards (track 9)

Cascio tracks only contributions 

 Rudy Bird – musician (tracks 3, 5)
 Stuart Brawley – assistant recording engineer (track 3, rap: 5), recording engineer (7), musician (3, 5, 7), talking voice talent (7)
 Eddie "Angelikson" Cascio – producer, composer, musician (tracks 3, 5, 7)
 Myron Chandler – talking voiceover recording engineer (track 7)
 Joe Corcoran – assistant recording engineer (track 3, rap: 5), drum machine (3, 5, 7), recording engineer (7), musician (3, 5, 7)
 Brandon Datoli – assistant string section recording engineer (track 7)
 Steven Dennis – assistant recording engineer (track 3)
 Reggie Dozer – string section recording engineer (track 7)
 Nicole Garcia – musician (track 3)
 Jesus Garnica – audio mixing assistant (track 3)
 Dave Hampton – talking voiceover recording engineer (track 7)
 Travis Harrington – assistant recording engineer (track 3)
 Drew Harris – assistant recording engineer (track 3, rap: 5), recording engineer (7)
 Sean Hurley – musician (track 3)
 Curtis "50 Cent" Jackson – rap vocals, rap lyrics (track 5)
 Sharon Jackson – musician (track 5)
 Jaycen Joshua – audio mixing (track 3)
 Michael LeFevre – vocal producer, talking voice talent (track 7)
 Glen Marchese – assistant recording engineer (rap: track 5), recording engineer (7)
 Naiden Maynard – kids screaming voices (track 5)
 Nigel Maynard – kids screaming voices (track 5)
 Stacey Michaels – talking voice talent (track 7)
 Luis Navarro – recording engineer (track 5)
 Monty Neuble – musician (track 3)
 Lisa Orkin – talking voice talent (track 7)
 Sandy Orkin – talking voice talent (track 7)
 Orianthi Panagaris – guitar, musician (track 5)
 James Porte – composer, background vocals (tracks 3, 5, 7), drum machine (3, 5, 7), musician (3, 7)
 Zachariah Redding – 50 Cent's rap vocal recording assistant (track 5)
 Jason Sherwood – assistant recording engineer (track 3)
 Duane Starling – additional background vocals (track 3)
 Christopher "Tricky" Stewart – producer (track 3)
 Cameron Stone – musician (tracks 3, 5)
 Brian "B-Luv" Thomas – recording engineer (track 3)
 Jamie Wollam – musician (track 3)
 Benjamin Wright – string section arranger, strings conductor (track 7)
 The Benjamin Wright Orchestra – string section (track 7)
 Andrew Wuepper – recording engineer (track 3)

Charts

Weekly charts

Year-end charts

Certifications

Release history

See also
 List of unreleased songs recorded by Michael Jackson
 List of music released posthumously

References

External links
 Michael at Metacritic

2010 compilation albums
Michael Jackson compilation albums
Albums produced by Michael Jackson
Albums produced by Akon
Albums produced by Lenny Kravitz
Albums produced by Teddy Riley
Albums produced by Theron Feemster
Epic Records compilation albums
MJJ Music compilation albums
Albums published posthumously